
Year 575 (DLXXV) was a common year starting on Tuesday (link will display the full calendar) of the Julian calendar. The denomination 575 for this year has been used since the early medieval period, when the Anno Domini calendar era became the prevalent method in Europe for naming years.

Events 
 By place 

 Europe 
 The Franks under Sigibert I pursue his half brother Chilperic I, and conquer the cities Poitiers and Tournai. While he is proclaimed new king of Neustria by the nobles, Sigibert is assassinated at Vitry-en-Artois (Northern Gaul) by hirelings of Fredegund.
 Childebert II succeeds his father Sigibert I as king of Austrasia. His mother Brunhilda becomes regent and seeks protection from Guntram, king of Burgundy. He adopts Childebert as his own son and heir. A group of Frankish aristocrats rule Austrasia.
 The Visigoths under King Liuvigild invade the Suebian Kingdom (Northern Spain). Intermarriage between Goths and non-Goths is allowed in the Visigothic Kingdom (approximate date).

 Britain 
 The Convention of Druim Cett: Irish kings discuss the relationship between them and King Áedán mac Gabráin of Dál Riata. The Irish colony (now western Scotland) is confirmed, and rights to tax and levy are agreed to between the rulers.
 The Anglo-Saxon kingdom of East Anglia is divided into the English counties of Norfolk and Suffolk, and perhaps the eastern part of the Cambridgeshire Fens (approximate date).

 Asia Minor 
 Byzantine–Sassanid War: A Byzantine army under command of Maurice drives the Persians from Cappodocia (modern Turkey), and strengthens the Byzantine position in Caucasian Albania.
 Alexander of Tralles, Greek physician,  writes "Libri duodecim de re Medica" (approximate date).

 Asia 
 Tardu succeeds his father Istämi, as governor (yabgu) of the Western Turkic Khaganate (Central Asia).

 By topic 

 Religion 
 Zhiyi, Chinese monk, travels to Mount Tiantai for intensive study and practice. He works with a group of disciples on the Indian meditation of śamatha and vipaśyanā.
 June 2 – Pope Benedict I succeeds Pope John III as the 62nd pope.

Births 
 Al-Khansa, Arabic poet (d. 645)
 Heraclius, emperor of the Byzantine Empire (approximate date)
 Wen Yanbo, chancellor of the Tang Dynasty (d. 637)

Deaths 
 August 2 – Ahudemmeh, Syriac Orthodox Grand Metropolitan of the East.
 Áed mac Echach, king of Connacht (Ireland)
 Cerbonius, bishop of Populonia (Central Italy)
 Istämi, ruler (yabgu) of the Western Turkic Khaganate
 Sigebert I, king of Austrasia (approximate date)

References